White Sulphur Springs, also known as White Sulphur Springs Historic Site, is a historic site located along LA 8, about  southwest of Jena.

The site is a small clearing including a spring encased in a gazebo built c.1916 by W.G. Walker. Due to its supposed curative powers, the spring was once surrounded by a health resort with numerous buildings. The gazebo is the only remaining structure, and was restored c.1975. The spring was originally discovered by Joseph P. Ward in 1883.

The site was listed on the National Register of Historic Places on December 17, 1982.

See also
 National Register of Historic Places listings in La Salle Parish, Louisiana

References

Houses on the National Register of Historic Places in Louisiana
Houses completed in 1916
LaSalle Parish, Louisiana